Richard appears as Dean of Armagh in 1206, the first recorded incumbent. He presumably served until his replacement by Marcus in 1238.

References

Deans of Armagh
13th-century Irish Roman Catholic priests